Swipp was a privately held company based in Mountain View, California that provided a social intelligence platform that captures, aggregates, and reports real time sentiment data via consumer and commercial applications built on their platform.

Swipp referred to the aggregated data as the "Swipp Index" as it aggregated multiple social data points in near real-time, and gave a global view of the data source (location, gender, age), trending information, over-time reporting, and other data points when available.

Swipp took a crowd-informed view on a topic and displayed it in conjunction with topic based reference data from Freebase. The resulting assemblage Swipp referred to as "Social Intelligence" – "Social" because it extracts data from Swipp-based social expression touch-points embedded across the internet and connected applications, and "Intelligent” because it merges that social expression data with factual data from sources such as Freebase.

History

The company was founded by Don Thorson (CEO), and Charlie Costantini (CSO) in 2011; Ramani Narayan (CTO) joined in 2012.

The company received $500K seed funding in early 2011 and a subsequent $3 million in a later institutional round in May 2012, both from Old Willow Partners. Swipp came to market on January 23, 2013, globally launching their platform, consumer and commercial applications. Swipp received an additional $2 million in institutional investment from its original investors in April 2013.

The company's last Tweet was sent in late 2013 and the company went defunct shortly thereafter.

See also
Silicon Valley
Sentiment analysis
Big data

References

Companies based in Mountain View, California
Companies established in 2011
Privately held companies based in California